Judith Barcroft (born July 6, 1942 in Washington, D.C.) is an American Broadway and soap opera actress.

She began her soap career in 1966 by creating the role of Lenore Moore on Another World, a role she played until 1971. In 1970, she made a cameo appearance as Lenore on the AW spin-off, Somerset. Lenore was in a popular romance with attorney Walter Curtin (Val Dufour) who defended Lenore for the murder of Wayne Addison (Robert Milli) but who secretly was guilty of killing Wayne himself. Her storyline had Lenore being a bitter enemy with Liz Matthews (then Nancy Wickwire) who was in love with Wayne but blamed Lenore for stealing his affections.

After leaving Another World, she took over the role of Ann Tyler on All My Children. As the daughter of the wealthy Phoebe and Charles Tyler, she married handsome lawyer Paul Martin. After Ann gave birth to a baby who died suddenly, she underwent a mental breakdown, forcing Paul and Phoebe to commit her to a mental hospital. She played the role for six years, leaving All My Children in 1977. The following year, she appeared on The Edge of Night, playing Louise Cavanaugh (Miles and April's mother in dream sequences) for a few episodes.

That same year, she stepped in for Marie Masters in the role of  Dr. Susan Burke Stewart on As the World Turns while Masters was on emergency leave. It was at this time that Barcroft took a three-year hiatus from acting, returning to daytime in 1981 on Ryan's Hope in the role of Barbara Wilde, a soap actress desperate for publicity. Barbara briefly dated Dr. Seneca Beaulac but sued him for malpractice after blaming him for going forward with a medical procedure that threatened to destroy her career. In 1983, she returned to As the World Turns for a brief stint as D.A. Sara Comstock, which she repeated the following year. She then returned to The Edge of Night in a completely different role, playing Laurie Karr's psychiatrist, Dr. Eleanor Prentice, until the show was canceled in the winter of 1984. In 1986, the producers of One Life to Live asked her to temporarily fill in for Erika Slezak as Victoria Lord Buchanan. Her final appearance on soap operas was in 1988, playing a pharmacist for one day on Another World.

Judith has been married to soap opera writer Wisner Washam since June 15, 1969. They have a son, Ian Washam, and a daughter, Amy Masterson.

Her Broadway credits are:  Mating Dance, Dinner At Eight, Plaza Suite,  All God's Chillun Got Wings, Elephant Man, Betrayal, and Shimada.

References

External links
 
 
 

American television actresses
American soap opera actresses
1942 births
Living people
21st-century American women